Mary Taylor is a former utility who played from  through  in the All-American Girls Professional Baseball League. She batted and threw right-handed.

Born in Long Beach, California, Mary Taylor played with two teams of the All-American Girls Professional Baseball League during the final two years of its existence. She was recruited by Bill Allington for the league in 1953 and was assigned to the Rockford Peaches.

In her rookie season, Taylor served as a backup outfielder and also was used at first base. She batted an average of .238 (38-for-160) with 19 runs batted in and a .338 slugging percentage in 46 games, while her four home runs tied for ninth best in the league. In 1954 she joined the Kalamazoo Lassies, a team who finished in fourth place and surprised first-place Fort Wayne Daisies in the championship series. In decisive Game 5, Taylor had a perfect 5-for-5 game with two doubles, delivering good support to pitcher June Peppas and Kalamazoo that led to an 8–5 victory against the Daisies, during what turned out to be the AAGPBL's last-ever game.

Following her baseball career, Taylor graduated from Pepperdine University and majored in physical education.

She is part of Women in Baseball, a permanent display based at the Baseball Hall of Fame and Museum in Cooperstown, New York, which was unveiled in 1988 to honor the entire All-American Girls Professional Baseball League.

Career statistics
Batting 

Fielding

Sources

All-American Girls Professional Baseball League players
Baseball players from Long Beach, California
Pepperdine University alumni
Year of birth missing
Possibly living people